The Anstey Range is a mountain range in southeastern British Columbia, Canada, located east of the Seymour Arm of Shuswap Lake, south of Ratchford Creek and between the Perry River on the east. It has an area of 507 km2 and is a subrange of the Monashee Mountains which in turn form part of the Columbia Mountains.

See also
List of mountain ranges

References

Monashee Mountains